is a Japanese football player for Oita Trinita.

Club statistics
Updated to 14 October 2020.

References

External links

Profile at Oita Trinita

1996 births
Living people
Association football people from Miyazaki Prefecture
Japanese footballers
J1 League players
J2 League players
J3 League players
Vissel Kobe players
Oita Trinita players
J.League U-22 Selection players
Tokushima Vortis players
Giravanz Kitakyushu players
Association football goalkeepers